MINERVA-Australis is a dedicated exoplanet observatory, operated by the University of Southern Queensland, in Queensland, Australia. The facility is located at USQ's Mount Kent Observatory, and saw first light in quarter two 2018. Commissioning of the facility was completed in mid-2019, and the facility was officially launched on 23 July 2019.

The facility follows the innovative model first deployed in the northern hemisphere's Miniature Exoplanet Radial Velocity Array (MINERVA), a northern hemisphere exoplanet facility located at the U.S. Fred Lawrence Whipple Observatory at Mt. Hopkins, Arizona. MINERVA-Australis is being used to perform follow-up and characterisation observations of exoplanets discovered by NASA's  Transiting Exoplanet Survey Satellite (TESS), which was launched in April, 2018.

The project's principal investigator is USQ astronomer  Rob Wittenmyer, who leads a consortium of partners from institutions across the world (UNSW Australia; Nanjing University; University of California, Riverside; MIT; George Mason University; University of Louisville; University of Texas at Austin; University of Florida).

Science objectives 

The primary mission of MINERVA-Australis is to support observations carried out by the NASA TESS spacecraft, providing dedicated follow-up and characterisation of newly discovered exoplanets. During commissioning, the facility was used to pursue targets of opportunity, and to carry out work extending the baseline of the  Anglo-Australian Planet Search program. MINERVA-Australis allows researchers to obtain precise radial velocity observations for target stars, enabling the masses of planets discovered by the TESS spacecraft to be directly measured, and has recently demonstrated a radial velocity precision of approximately 1 m/s. 

In addition to providing high precision velocity measurements, MINERVA-Australis will also offer high-cadence photometric observations. This is to facilitate direct follow-up transit observations of TESS candidate planets (particularly those in fields from which TESS has moved on). It can also enable the observation of occultation events and other transient targets of opportunity.

During commissioning, observations made by the MINERVA-Australis array contributed to the discovery of 13 new exoplanets, working in collaboration with researchers at institutions across the globe.

The facility 

MINERVA-Australis currently consists of four PlaneWave CDK700 telescopes, (five CDK700's were available for the period July 2019 - April 2020, while a donated CDK700 telescope was waiting for another project to start). These 0.7 m telescopes have two ports, allowing each to be used for either spectroscopic or photometric observations. Each telescope sits in its own automated clam-shell Astrohaven dome, distributed in an approximate semi-circle around the main observatory building.

Photometric work is to be carried out using Andor cameras, with 2k x 2k back-illuminated CCDs with 15 µm pixels. These cameras offer an effective field of view > 20'.

The telescopes are connected by optical fibre to a stabilised, R = 75,000 echelle spectrograph, covering the wavelengths 480 - 630nm, designed by KiwiStar Optics. The spectrograph uses simultaneous calibration in a separate fibre. Prior to 2020, the simultaneous calibration was provided by a Thorium-Argon lamp. Because of the wavelength range and the very low scattered light the simultaneous calibration source is now supplied by a Tungsten slit-flat lamp backlighting an iodine cell. This is a different approach to the normal 'iodine cell' method that passes the starlight through an iodine cell.

See also
List of telescopes of Australia

References

External links 

  University of Louisville and Minerva Australis at Mt. Kent

Astronomical instruments
Astronomical surveys
Exoplanet search projects
Optical telescopes